"It's All the Same to Me" is a song written by Kerry Kurt Phillips and Jerry Laseter, and recorded by American country music artist Billy Ray Cyrus.  It was released in May 1997 as the first single from his compilation album The Best of Billy Ray Cyrus: Cover to Cover.  The song reached #19 on the Billboard Hot Country Singles & Tracks chart.

Chart performance

References

1997 singles
1997 songs
Billy Ray Cyrus songs
Song recordings produced by Keith Stegall
Mercury Records singles
Songs written by Kerry Kurt Phillips